Tláhuac metro station is a station of the Mexico City Metro in the colonia of El Triángulo, Tláhuac, Mexico City. It is an at-grade station with two island platforms that serves as the southern terminus of Line 12 (the Golden Line). The station's pictogram features the glyph of Tláhuac. It is followed by Tlaltenco station, in the same borough. The station was opened on 30 October 2012, on the first day of the service Tláhuac–Mixcoac.

Since it was planned, Tláhuac metro station has had multiple conflicts and incidents, including protests from the previous owners of the land lots, a  closure in 2014 due to structural faults found in the elevated section of the line, and the subsequent collapse of the track near Olivos station. The facilities are accessible for people with disabilities as there are elevators, tactile pavings and braille signage plates. Additionally, there is a bicycle parking station, an Internet café, and a bus terminal. In 2019, the station had an average daily ridership of 56,831 passengers, making it the 14th busiest station in the network and the busiest of the line.

Location

Tláhuac is a metro station along San Rafael Atlixco Avenue, in the colonia (Mexican Spanish for "neighborhood") of El Triángulo, in the Tláhuac borough, in southeastern Mexico City. Within the system, Tlaltenco is the next station.

Tláhuac is serviced by a bus terminal, whose tender process for its construction started in September 2010 and required an investment of 280 million pesos. Although the bus terminal was built along with the station, the Centro de transferencia modal (CETRAM), a type of transport hub, was officially opened until January 2014. The delay was caused by a conflict between the representatives of 108 concessionary transport routes. The area is serviced by Routes 141, 148, and 149 of the Red de Transporte de Pasajeros network.

Exits
There are two exits:

Northeast: San Rafael Atlixco Avenue and Antonio Bejaral Avenue, El Triángulo.
Northwest: San Rafael Atlixco Avenue and José Bernal Street, El Triángulo.

History and construction

To build Tláhuac metro station and Line 12's rail yard, the Government of Mexico City expropriated a place called Terromotitla in November 2008, and 126 parcels of the ejido San Francisco Tlaltenco in April 2009. According to the then-General Director of the Metro, Francisco Bojórquez, all the parcels were legally purchased at 600 pesos per square meter. However, both expropriations were protested by ejidatarios, who considered them to have been illegally acquired.

Line 12 of the Mexico City Metro was built by Empresas ICA in association with Alstom Mexicana and Grupo Carso. The station was opened on 30 October 2012, on the first day of the Mixcoac–Tláhuac service. The pictogram of the station references the glyph of the borough. The facilities are accessible for people with disabilities as there are elevators, tactile pavings and braille signage plates; there is also a bicycle parking station and an Internet café.

Incidents
Since 2010, the Superior Auditor of the Federation has audited Line 12 several times and has reported several faults—like cracks and detachments—along the line, including some inside the Tláhuac metro station, the Tlaltenco–Tláhuac interstation, and at Tláhuac's rail yard.

From 12 March 2014 to 29 November 2015, Tláhuac was closed due to technical and structural faults in the Atlalilco–Tláhuac stretch. After the 19 September 2017 earthquake damaged the Line 12 tracks, Tláhuac remained closed until 30 October 2017. On 13 September 2020, a sixteen-year-old woman gave birth inside the station, the second of the year in the network.

On 3 May 2021, Tláhuac metro station was closed after a portion of Line 12's elevated railway collapsed near Olivos station. Since then, the city has provided public and private transportation from Tláhuac to Atlalilco, Tasqueña and Universidad metro stations. On 26 May 2021, the Mexico City Metrobús started a free, temporary route from Tláhuac to Atlalilco station. On 21 June 2021, an alternate route toward Coyuya metro station was started.

Ridership
According to the data provided by the authorities, the Tláhuac metro station has been one of the busiest stations of the system's 195 stations. Except for the years when the station was closed for several months, commuters have averaged per year between 34,000 and 57,000 daily entrances. In 2019, before the impact of the COVID-19 pandemic on public transport, the station's ridership totaled 20,743,670 passengers, an increase of 2,118,568 passengers compared to 2018. In the same year, Tláhuac was the 14th busiest of the system and it was the busiest of the line.

Gallery

Notes

Further reading

References

External links

2012 establishments in Mexico
Accessible Mexico City Metro stations
Mexico City Metro Line 12 stations
Mexico City Metro stations in Tláhuac
Railway stations opened in 2012